Katwaria Sarai is an urban village in the south of New Delhi. It is one of the three villages, along with Ber Sarai and Jia Sarai, bordering the Indian Institute of Technology (IIT).

References

Villages in New Delhi district
Caravanserais in India